The Broxbourne Mill Stream which diverges from the River Lee Navigation just south of Dobbs Weir, is one of the few remaining 'old river' loops of the River Lea, with a relatively natural channel form and a diverse range of habitats. Broxbourne developed as a small settlement for milling at a river crossing point at Broxbourne Mill. Spital Brook empties into the Mill Stream by Nazeing New Road.

References

Rivers of Hertfordshire
Tributaries of the River Lea
0Broxbourne